John Myers Felder (July 7, 1782 – September 1, 1851) was a United States politician.

Biography
His grandfather was a native of Switzerland, came to South Carolina about 1720, and was killed during the American Revolution while defending his house against an attack by Tories. The grandson was born in the vicinity of Orangeburg, South Carolina. He graduated from Yale University in 1804, a roommate and close friend of John Caldwell Calhoun.  After graduation, he studied at Litchfield Law School, and was admitted to the bar in 1808. He was elected to the South Carolina House of Representatives in 1812.

In 1830, he was elected to the United States House of Representatives and served in Congress for four years, first as a Jacksonian and from 1833 as a Nullifier.  After declining renomination in 1834, he went back to South Carolina, where the voters of Orangeburg returned him to the South Carolina House of Representatives in 1840.  He served there until his death on September 1, 1851.  Felder retired from the legal profession in 1830, and became a prosperous mill owner and planter.  He never married and had no children, although his sister Eliza has many descendants.

Notes

References

1782 births
1851 deaths
People from Orangeburg, South Carolina
Nullifier Party politicians
Nullifier Party members of the United States House of Representatives
Members of the South Carolina House of Representatives
Litchfield Law School alumni
American lawyers
Jacksonian members of the United States House of Representatives from South Carolina
Yale University alumni
19th-century American politicians